Secrest-Wampler House, also known as the James Secrest House, is a historic home located in Washington Township, Owen County, Indiana.  It was built in 1859, and is a two-story, brick I-house with Greek Revival style design elements.  It has a one-story rear ell, and the front facade features a two-story portico.  The house was restored in the 1990s.

It was listed on the National Register of Historic Places in 2002.

References

Houses on the National Register of Historic Places in Indiana
Greek Revival houses in Indiana
Houses completed in 1859
Buildings and structures in Owen County, Indiana
National Register of Historic Places in Owen County, Indiana